Château du Prada is a château in Landes, Nouvelle-Aquitaine, France. It dates to 1764.

References

Châteaux in Landes (department)
Houses completed in 1764
1764 establishments in France